Yongning is a town under the administration of Hui County, Gansu, China. , it has one residential community and 12 villages under its administration.

References 

Township-level divisions of Gansu
Hui County